I Knew Her Well is a 1965  Italian comedy-drama film directed by Antonio Pietrangeli and starring Stefania Sandrelli.

In 2008 the film was selected to enter the list of the 100 Italian films to be saved.

Plot synopsis
Adriana (Stefania Sandrelli) is a provincial Italian young woman who moves to Rome because she wants to be a celebrity.

Cast
 Stefania Sandrelli as Adriana Astarelli
 Mario Adorf as Emilio Ricci, aka Bietolone
 Jean-Claude Brialy as Dario Marchionni
 Joachim Fuchsberger as The Writer
 Nino Manfredi as Cianfanna
 Enrico Maria Salerno as Roberto
 Ugo Tognazzi as Gigi Baggini
 Karin Dor as Barbara, the lady friend of Adriana
 Franco Fabrizi as Paganelli
 Turi Ferro as Il commissario
 Robert Hoffmann as Antonio Marais
 Franco Nero as Italo - The garage attendant
 Véronique Vendell as Alice Stendhal (credited as Veronique Vendell)
 Franca Polesello as Maria - The usherette
 Renato Terra as Man in the caravan (credited as Renato Terra Caizzi)

Soundtrack
 "L'Eclisse twist"
Performed by Mina

 "Addio"
Performed by Mina

 "Ogni giorno che passa"
Performed by Mia Genberg

 "Le stelle d'oro"
Performed by Peppino Di Capri

 "Sweet William"
Performed by Millie

 "Surf della Frusta"
By Gino Marinacci

 "Oggi e domenica per noi"
Performed by Sergio Endrigo

 "Mani bucate"
Performed by Sergio Endrigo

 "Lasciati baciare col Letkiss"
Performed by Gemelle Kessler

 "Roberta"
Performed by Peppino Di Capri

 "What Am I Living For"
Performed by Millie

 "More"
Performed by Gilbert Bécaud

 "E se domani"
Performed by Mina

 "Abbracciami forte"
Performed by Ornella Vanoni

 "Dimmi la verità"
Performed by Sergio Endrigo

 "Toi"
Performed by Gilbert Bécaud

 "Let Kiss"
Orchestrated by Yvar Sanna

Awards
Three Nastro d'Argento awards: Best Director, Best Script, and Best Supporting Actor (Ugo Tognazzi).
Pietrangeli was named Best Director at the Mar del Plata Film Festival

References

External links
 
I Knew Her Well: City Girl an essay by Alexander Stille at the Criterion Collection

1965 films
Italian black-and-white films
1960s Italian-language films
1965 comedy-drama films
Commedia all'italiana
Films directed by Antonio Pietrangeli
Films with screenplays by Ruggero Maccari
Films scored by Benedetto Ghiglia
1960s Italian films